Tupo may refer to:

 Tupo (crater), on the dwarf planet Ceres
 Tupo Fa'amasino (born 1966), Samoan rugby union player
 Tupo station, North Korea